Elachista pusillella is a moth in the family Elachistidae. It was described by Sinev and Sruoga in 1995. It is found in south-eastern Siberia and Japan.

The larvae feed on Carex pauciflora. They mine the leaves of their host plant. The mine has the form of a linear full-depth mine.

References

Moths described in 1995
pusillella
Moths of Asia